Malaysian Dreamgirl (often abbreviated to MDG) was an online reality television show in which a number of young women competed for the title of Malaysian Dreamgirl and a chance to start their career in the modeling industry. The show lasted for only 2 seasons in a period of only 2 years.

The show was created by the CEO of Capxion Media, Jared Solomon and hosted by Sazzy Falak in Season 1. Elaine Daly took over as host starting Season 2. The first season premiered in March 2008 and was added into the Malaysia Book of Records as Malaysia's First Online Reality Model Search.

Show format
The first season of Malaysian Dreamgirl starts with 12 contestants. The participants will have to outshine each other on the catwalk fashion shows, photo shoots, self-make up and self-styling assignments whilst living together for 10 weeks. Makeovers are administered to contestants early in the season.

Each 2 episode of Malaysian Dreamgirl covers the events of roughly a week of real time, and features a fashion challenge or photo shoot and the elimination of one or more contestants. Usually, on the Saturdays episodes, means that the starting of each new week, except for Episode 2, it was an Audition episode; and on Thursdays episode means that one contestant is going to be eliminated, except for Episode 1 and 3, because Episode 1 is an Audition episode, as for Episode 3, voting are not opened yet, as for Episode 5, 2 girls were eliminated. Elimination of one or more contestants are based on publics' votes.

As of Season 1, the panel includes model, actress, and former beauty queen, Elaine Daly, celebrity blogger, Kenny Sia and fashion stylist Lim Jimmy. For Season 2, the current panel includes Elaine Daly, Lim Jimmy, founder of AndrewsModel, Andrew Tan, and founder of the beauty product 'Beautilicous', Julie Wong. Each episode is usually associated with a theme in the world of modeling, such as dealing with the press in interviews or appearing in a runway show.

An episode usually begins with the contestants receiving training in an area concurrent with the week's theme. For example, contestants may get coached in runway walking, improvisational acting, or applying make-up to suit various occasions. A related challenge soon follows, such as a mock runway show or interview, and a winner is chosen by a judge. She receives some prize, such as clothing, portfolio expanding, a night out, or an advantage at the next photo shoot, and she is usually allowed to share the benefits with a certain number of other contestants of her choice.

The next segment is a photo shoot, and each contestant's performance will reflect heavily on her judging for that week. Each season features photo shoots such as lingerie shots, beauty shots.

The final segment of each odd number episode is judging. Each contestant's photo is then shown and evaluated by the judging panel. The elimination process is ceremonious, as Sazzy/Daly announced last three/five contestants who have called their name as "the bottom three/five", and Sazzy critiques each one before revealing which of the one/three contestants has been eliminated. However, there have been three exceptions, as a non-elimination, and the original eliminee was saved by another contestant's decision to quit.

Seasons

Season 1

Prizes

The winner will receive:

 An exclusive cover spread in NewMan magazine
 Will drive away a brand new Nissan Latio 1.8Ti (A)
 A cash prize of RM10,000 from AmBank NexG PrePaid MasterCard
 A Wella Professionals hamper worth RM3,000
 A voucher from Escada fragrances, Bebe apparel, Nose footwear worth total RM2,500

Contestants

(ages stated are at time of contest)

Results table

 The contestant withdrew from the competition
 The contestant was originally eliminated from the competition but was saved
 The contestant was in danger of elimination
 The contestant was eliminated
 The contestant won the competition

Season 2

Prizes

The winner will receive: 
 A modelling contract with Andrews Models
 A spread in InTrend magazine
 A brand new Chevrolet Aveo Lux 1.4(A)
 Will drive away a brand new HP Pavilion Notebook
 A cash prize of RM10,000
 A vouchers from Beautilicious cosmetics, Escada Incredible Me fragrances, Wacoal lingerie, Marie France Bodyline, Bella Skin Care, Svenson Hair Care, Wella Professionals hair products worth total RM6,500

Contestants

(ages stated are at time of contest)

Results table

 The contestant withdrew from the competition
 The contestant was originally eliminated from the competition but was saved
 The contestant was in danger of elimination
 The contestant was eliminated
 The contestant won the competition

Crossover Appearances
Cindy (Season 1) joined a reality show called Castrol EDGE Sport Speed Challenge along with another partner, Eva, they're named "Hot Chics".
Jay (Season 1) is the winning model for Project Runway Malaysia (Season 1).
Ming (Season 2) was a finalist in the Estee Lauder Model Search 2007.
Acha (Season 2) is in the Top-30 for Redbull Female Driver Search.
Juanita (Season 2) was a Top 3 finalist (Category A: Under 29's) in the Estee Lauder Model Search 2009, she is also in the running to become Ford Models: Supermodels Of The World Malaysia.

See also
I Wanna Be A Model

External links
Official Website

 
2008 Malaysian television series debuts
2009 Malaysian television series endings